Clarence Reginald "Skip" Graham  (February 28, 1907 – January 28, 1989) was a prominent librarian and leader in the profession. He was president of the American Library Association from 1950 to 1951.

Graham served as director of the Louisville Public Library for 35 years (1942–1977). In 1952, under his leadership, the Louisville Free Public Library became the first public library in the South to open its main library to African Americans. He became a national figure in the 1950s when he and the Mayor of Louisville, Kentucky, Charles Farnsley, made the public library a model for communities nationwide. Their partnership included a library-based radio station (WFPL) in 1950; concerts and university lectures in the libraries; and 16-mm movies and prints of works of art you could check out. Graham retired in the early 1970s.

Graham was president of the American Library Association during the organizations 75th Anniversary Celebration.

Publications
 The first book of public libraries (Watts, 1959)

References

 

1907 births
1989 deaths
Presidents of the American Library Association
American librarians
People from Louisville, Kentucky